Forever Breathes the Lonely Word is the sixth album by English alternative rock band Felt, released in September 1986. This is the first Felt album with no instrumental tracks. The cover photo subject is keyboardist Martin Duffy.

The record features Duffy's organ alongside two guitars, one sometimes played by Lawrence. The organ is foregrounded in the mix and creates a vastly new sound for the band.

In a 2011 NME feature, Hamish MacBain said of the album that "Lawrence delivered his masterpiece," and described it as "the first truly classic Creation album."

Track listing
All songs written by Lawrence.

Personnel
Felt
Lawrence – vocals, electric guitar
Martin Duffy – hammond organ, piano, backing vocals
Marco Thomas – bass guitar, guitar
Gary Ainge – drums
Additional personnel
Tony Willé – acoustic and electric guitars, backing vocals
Sarah & Yvonne – backing vocals
John A. Rivers – production, backing vocals

References 

Felt (band) albums
1986 albums
Creation Records albums
Albums produced by John A. Rivers